You Are the One is a 2006 Filipino romantic comedy film directed by Cathy Garcia-Molina and starring Sam Milby and Toni Gonzaga.

Plot
Cute and bubbly government employee Sally Malasmas (Toni Gonzaga) reluctantly agrees to process her application for a visa, obeying her parents' wish that their small family be reunited. The rest of her family: mom, dad and older sister, Charry (Jodi Sta. Maria) are already residing states-side and they worry that she is lonely living in the Philippines by herself; but as far as Sally is concerned, her simple Philippine life surrounded by loyal, loving friends and co-workers is nearly perfect. However, during  the interview process for her Visa application, things goes awry and her application gets abruptly denied by the handsome, yet dismissive Filipino American consul, Will Derby (Sam Milby).

The next day, a bewildered Will wakes from a one-night stand with a girl he picked up from a bar the night before and due to the notorious Manila gridlock, he misses work. He finds himself instead diverted to the Census Bureau where Sally incidentally works. Seeing an opportunity for revenge, Sally buries Will's inquiry form beneath an already mounting pile of paperwork. As she expected, Will waits all day for his turn through sweltering heat and hunger until he gets fed up and finally confronts the scheming Sally. She gives him a dose of his own medicine and nonchalantly brushes him off, informing him that his form cannot be processed properly because it is incomplete and that he must return the next day since its time for her to go home.  An outraged Will cries foul to Sally's supervisor, who sides with him. Thus, in order to redeem the bureau's reputation, Sally is ordered to stay behind after hours until Will finds the information he needs.

As it turns out, Will's cold and sullen demeanor is due to him agonizing over the search for his birth parents and any remaining family members he may still have in the Philippines; but more importantly, the reason why he was placed for adoption, a question that has been gnawing at him for years.  Sympathizing with Will's plight, Sally takes it upon herself to help him find what he's looking for and through this common purpose the pair bonds and grows closer.

But it seems that each has a different idea of exactly what their new-found friendship means to the other. Will's casual relationships with women conflicts with Sally's more traditional, old-fashioned virtues. Together, they must set aside differences, overcome clashing cultural prejudices and ethnocentric beliefs; otherwise, unsettled issues may put a stopper to their blossoming romance before they get the chance to realize its full potential.

Cast

Main Cast

Toni Gonzaga as Sally Malasmas
Sam Milby as Will Derby / Vernard Garcia

Supporting cast
Jodi Sta. Maria as Chari Malasmas
Eugene Domingo as Dora
Gio Alvarez as Melody
Anita Linda
Susan Africa as Sally and Chari's mother
Lito Pimentel as Sally's boss
Roldan Aquino
Crispin Pineda
Jao Mapa as Venjamin Garcia
Arron Villaflor as Ryan
Ahron Villena
Rio Locsin as Myra Ramos-Garcia
Albert Rabe

Reception
The film grossed 100 million pesos. Philip Cu-Unjieng of the Philippine STAR describes the film as light entertainment. He notes the direction of Garcia-Molina and Gonzaga's performance. The review also takes note of Sta. Maria and Domingo as supporting cast.

References

External links
 

2006 films
Films directed by Cathy Garcia-Molina
Star Cinema films
Filipino-language films